The Lazarus effect is a concept in semiconductor physics. Lazarus effect may also refer to:

The Lazarus Effect (novel), a 1983 novel by Frank Herbert and Bill Ransom
The Lazarus Effect (2010 film), a documentary film about AIDS
The Lazarus Effect (2015 film), a  supernatural horror film directed by David Gelb and written by Luke Dawson and Jeremy Slater.

See also
Lazarus (disambiguation)
Lazarus phenomenon
Lazarus taxon
The Lazarus Experiment